Amata pseudosimplex is a moth of the family Erebidae. It was described by Josef J. de Freina in 2013. It is found in South Africa.

The larvae are polyphagous and have been reared on Taraxacum, Carduus and Plantago species.

References

 

Pseudosimp
Moths of Africa
Moths described in 2013